Spire is a high-rise building containing 496 condominium homes in Denver, Colorado, in the United States.

The building is at 14th Street and Champa Street in downtown Denver. It cost $175,000,000 to build, from 2007 to 2009. It contains one-, two-, and three-bedroom apartments. It is currently owned by Plant Holdings NA, Inc.

The average price per square foot in January 2018 was $648.50/sf.

References

External links
 Living above it all in Denver's second-highest downtown condo

Residential skyscrapers in Denver
Residential buildings completed in 2009